Speaker of the House of Commons is a political leadership position found in countries that have a House of Commons, where the membership of the body elects a speaker to lead its proceedings.

Systems that have such a position include:

Speaker of the British House of Commons, which has historically comprised:
Speaker of the House of Commons of England (until 1706)
Speaker of the House of Commons of Great Britain (1707–1800)
Speaker of the House of Commons of the United Kingdom (since 1801)
Speaker of the House of Commons (Canada) (since 1867)
Speaker of the House of Commons of Northern Ireland (1921–1972)
Speaker of the Irish House of Commons (until 1800)